In natural language processing a w-shingling is a set of unique shingles (therefore n-grams) each of which is composed of contiguous subsequences of tokens within a document, which can then be used to ascertain the similarity between documents.  The symbol w denotes the quantity of tokens in each shingle selected, or solved for.

The document, "a rose is a rose is a rose" can therefore be maximally tokenized as follows:

(a,rose,is,a,rose,is,a,rose)

The set of all contiguous sequences of 4 tokens (Thus 4=n, thus 4-grams) is

{ (a,rose,is,a), (rose,is,a,rose), (is,a,rose,is), (a,rose,is,a), (rose,is,a,rose) } Which can then be reduced, or maximally shingled in this particular instance to { (a,rose,is,a), (rose,is,a,rose), (is,a,rose,is) }.

Resemblance 

For a given shingle size, the degree to which two documents A and B resemble each other can be expressed as the ratio of the magnitudes of their shinglings' intersection and union, or

where |A| is the size of set A.  The resemblance is a number in the range [0,1], where 1 indicates that two documents are identical. This definition is identical with the Jaccard coefficient describing similarity and diversity of sample sets.

See also 
Bag-of-words model
Concept mining
k-mer
MinHash
N-gram
Rabin fingerprint
Rolling hash
Vector space model

References 

 Does not yet use the term "shingling".
 

Natural language processing